This list, assembled from Sports Car Club of America box scores, contains all vehicle marques that competed in the Trans-Am Series. The list is sorted first by era, and then by country. American marques from the Golden Age onward are divided among the Big Three.

Early Days

United States

General Motors
 Chevrolet Camaro 1967-72
 Chevrolet Corvair 1966
 Pontiac Tempest 1966

Ford
 Ford Mustang 1966-72
 Ford Falcon 1966
 Mercury Cougar 1967-1970

Chrysler
 Plymouth Barracuda 1966-70
 Dodge Challenger 1970-71 
 Dodge Dart 1966-70

American Motors
 Rambler American 1967-1968

United Kingdom
 Lotus Cortina 1966-72
 Ford Anglia 1967
 Morris Cooper S 1966-72
 Sunbeam Imp 1966-67

Germany
 Porsche 911 1967-69
 BMW New Class 1966-72
 Opel Kadett 1966 & 1972
 Volkswagen Beetle 1966-67 & 1972
 NSU Prinz 1966-70

Italy
 Alfa Romeo GTA 1966-72
 Lancia Fulvia 1967-68
 Fiat-Abarth 1000 1966-72

Sweden
 Saab 96 1966
 Saab 850 1966
 Volvo 122 1966-70

Japan
 Honda 600 1966
 Hino Contessa 1966

France
 Simca 1000 1966
 Renault Dauphine 1966 & 1970

Golden Era

Over Two Liter

General Motors
 Chevrolet Camaro 1967-72
 Pontiac Firebird 1968-72
 Chevrolet Nova 1970

Ford Motor Company
 Ford Mustang 1966-72
 Mercury Cougar 1967-70

Chrysler Corporation
 Dodge Challenger 1970-1971
 Plymouth Barracuda 1966-70
 Dodge Dart 1966-70

American Motors
 AMC Javelin 1968-72
 Rambler American 1967-1968

Under Two Liter

United Kingdom
 Lotus Cortina 1966-72
 Morris Cooper 1966-72
 Ford Escort 1970-72
 Triumph Vitesse 1971

Germany
 Porsche 911 1967-69
 BMW New Class 1966-72
 Opel Kadett 1966 & 1972
 Volkswagen Beetle 1966-67 & 1972
 NSU Prinz 1966-70

Italy
 Alfa Romeo GTA 1966-72
 Lancia Fulvia 1967-68
 Fiat-Abarth 1000 1966-72
 Fiat 124 1972
 Alfa Romeo GTV 1970

Sweden
 Volvo 122 1966-70
 Saab 96 1968
 Volvo PV544 1970
 Volvo 142 1971-72

Japan
 Datsun 510 1970-72
 Toyota 1600 1972

United States
 Ford Pinto 1971-72
 Ford Capri 1972

France
 Renault Dauphine 1966 & 1970
 Renault R8 1968

1973-79

North America
 AMC Hornet
 AMC Javelin
 Chevrolet Camaro
 Chevrolet Corvette C2
 Chevrolet Corvette C3
 Chevrolet Monza
 Ford Capri
 Ford Escort
 Ford Falcon
 Ford Mustang
 Pontiac Firebird
 Shelby Cobra
 Shelby GT350

Europe

Italy
 Alfa Romeo Alfetta
 Alfa Romeo GTV
 Alfa Romeo Montreal
 De Tomaso Pantera
 Ferrari 365
 Ferrari Boxer
 Ferrari Dino
 Lancia Stratos

Germany
 BMW New Class
 Opel Manta
 Porsche 911
 Porsche 914
 Porsche 924
 Porsche 930
 Porsche 934
 Porsche 935
 Porsche Carrera
 Volkswagen Rabbit
 Volkswagen Scirocco

Britain
 Jaguar E-Type
 Jaguar XJS
 Lotus Europa
 Triumph 2000
 Triumph TR7
 Triumph TR8

France
 Renault Alpine
 Simca

Japan
 Datsun 240Z
 Datsun 260Z
 Datsun 280Z
 Datsun 510
 Datsun B210
 Mazda RX-3
 Mazda RX-7
 Toyota Celica

GT Era

North America
AMC Concord
AMC Javelin
Buick Century (1985)
Buick Regal (1984-1988)
Buick Skyhawk (1983-1988)
Buick Somerset (1985-1988)
Chevrolet Beretta (1987-1988)
Chevrolet Camaro (1983-1988)
Chevrolet Corvette (1983-1988)
Chevrolet Monte Carlo (1986-1988)
Chevrolet Monza (1983-1984)
Dodge Charger
Dodge Daytona
Dodge Mirada (1985)
Ford Capri
Ford Fairmont (1983)
Ford Mustang (1983-1988)
Ford Thunderbird (1983-1988)
Lincoln Mark VII (1984-1985)
Mercury Capri (1983-1988)
Merkur XR4Ti (1986-1988)
Oldsmobile Calais (1986)
Oldsmobile Cutlass Supreme (1988)
Oldsmobile Toronado (1986-1988)
Plymouth Barracuda
Plymouth Volare (1983)
Pontiac Fiero (1984-1987)
Pontiac Firebird (1983-1988)
Pontiac Le Mans
Pontiac Trans Am (1983-1988)

Europe
Audi 200 (1988)
Audi 4000 (1983)
BMW 633 (eligible but never run)
BMW M1
Jaguar XJS (1988)
Lancia Beta
Mercedes-Benz 380 SL
Mercedes-Benz 450 SL
Porsche 911 (1983-1988)
Porsche 914
Porsche 924 (1983-1986)
Porsche 928 (1983)
Porsche 930 (1983-1985)
Porsche 934
Porsche 935
Porsche 944 (1986-1988)
Triumph TR8
Volkswagen Golf (1985-1986)
Volkswagen Rabbit (1984-1985)
Volkswagen Scirocco (1983-1985)

Asia
Datsun 240Z
Datsun 280ZX (1983-1984)
Mazda RX-7 (1983-1988)
Nissan 200SX (1985)
Nissan 300ZX (1984-1988)

American Muscle Revival Era (1989-2006)

Return
The following vehicles were used in the 2015 season:

TA1
Cadillac CTS-V
Chevrolet Camaro
Chevrolet Corvette
Ford Mustang
Jaguar XKR

TA2
Chevrolet Camaro
Dodge Challenger
Ford Mustang

TA3
Aston Martin GT4
BMW M3
Chevrolet Corvette
Dodge Viper
Porsche 996
Porsche 997

TA4
Chevrolet Camaro
Dodge Challenger
Ford Mustang

References

Trans-Am marques
Marques